Acanthopagrus akazakii is a fish native to the waters around New Caledonia.

References

Acanthopagrus
Fish of New Caledonia